Lao Nyo or Nyo is a Southwestern Tai language spoken mostly in Banteay Meanchey Province, Cambodia, as well as in Aranyaprathet District, Sa Kaew Province, Thailand. There are between 10,000 and 15,000 speakers of Lao Nyo in Cambodia. Lao Nyo is classified as a dialect of Lao rather than Nyo (Nyaw), based on linguistic data from Aun Loung Svay Chas village in Cambodia.

Name
The name Nyo likely came about as an exonym that was later adopted as an endonym; the Lao Nyo did not actually originate from the ethnic Nyo of Isan and Laos. This exonym may have been used due to the Lao Nyo's geographical origins or their language.

Classification
Nyo is a Southwestern Tai language spoken in Tha Uthen District, Nakhon Phanom Province and Kantharawichai District, Maha Sarakham Province of Thailand, as well as Khamkeut District, Bolikhamxay Province of Laos. However, Trongdee (2014) shows that Lao Nyo of Banteay Meanchey is not Nyo or Yo, although some Lao Nyo tones are more similar to Nyo tones than to Lao tones.

Locations
The following Lao Nyo villages have been documented in Cambodia.
Ou Chrov District, Banteay Meanchey Province
Koub Thom
Dong Aranh
Aunloung Svay Chas
Aun Loung 
Svay Thwey
Kou Touch
Koub Cherng
Koub Thboung
Khai Dorn 
Sery Pheap
Srei Sophone District, Banteay Meanchey Province
Phnum Bak village, Tuek Thla commune
Ambel village, Ou Ambel commune
Bor Vil District, Battambang Province (5 villages)
Makreu
Salor Klaen
Phum Leau
Prey Kapos
Phum Koub

In Sa Kaew Province, Thailand, the Lao Nyo are found in the following subdistricts (tambon) of Aranyaprathet District.
Klong Nam Sai (คลองน้ำใส)
Mueang Phai (เมืองไผ่)
Phan Suek (ผ่านศึก)
Tha Kham (ท่าข้าม)
Aranyaprathet (อรัญประเทศ)

Notes

References

Southwestern Tai languages
Languages of Cambodia
Languages of Thailand